Two Mothers may refer to:

 Two Mothers (1916 film) a 1916 American short film
 Two Mothers (1921 film), a 1921 Czech film
 Two Mothers (2007 film), a 2007 German documentary
 Adoration (2013 film), a 2013 film originally released under the title Two Mothers
 Two Mothers (TV series), a 2014 Korean television series
 Zwei Mütter, a 1957 East German film

See also 
 Judgment of Solomon